Lasseters is an entertainment complex located in Alice Springs, Northern Territory, Australia.  It incorporates a hotel, a casino, and the Alice Springs Convention Centre.

InterContinental Hotels Group (IHG) and Ford Dynasty Pty Ltd have signed a franchise agreement to refurbish and rebrand the current Lasseters Hotel Alice Springs; scheduled to reopen as Crowne Plaza Alice Springs Lasseters.

The hotel offers 205 guest rooms in addition to a variety of facilities and amenities including a resort pool, spa and sauna, fitness centre, casual dining in Tali a la carte restaurant and access to a variety of food and beverage options within the Lasseters casino.

The casino is the only one in Alice Springs, holding an exclusive casino licence for NT's Southern Division until 2018.

The resort is featured in the movie The Adventures of Priscilla, Queen of the Desert.

References

External links
 Crowne Plaza Alice Springs Lasseters Website

1981 establishments in Australia
Casinos completed in 1981
Hotels established in 1981
Buildings and structures in Alice Springs
Casinos in Australia
Tourist attractions in Alice Springs
Casino hotels